Joshua Otoo Opoku (born 6 April 1990), simply known as Joshua Otoo, is a Ghanaian professional footballer who plays as a right-back, for Hearts of Oak.

Career

Club
Otoo's began his career club career in the Vision Soccer Academy and signed in January 2004 with Auroras FC. After four-and-a-half years with Auroras FC Otoo left the club to sign on 11 June 2008 for Accra Hearts of Oak SC. On 1 December 2009, Otoo joined Ghana Football Leagues club Red Bull Ghana prior to joining on 1 July 2010 Ghana Premier League club Wa All Stars in the 2010–2011 Ghanaian Premier League season.

In January 2016, Otoo joined Armenian side Gandzasar Kapan, having previously agreed a deal with Hearts of Oak.

International
Otoo's first call-up in the Ghana national football team for a friendly match against Argentina national football team, and Otoo earned his debut in the match on 1 October 2009. Otoo was included in the Ghana preliminary team for the 2014 African Nations Championship, and finished as runner-up.

Career statistics

Club

International

Statistics accurate as of match played 30 September 2009

References

External links
 

1990 births
Living people
Ghanaian footballers
Association football fullbacks
Footballers from Accra
Accra Hearts of Oak S.C. players
Legon Cities FC players
Ghana Premier League players
Ghana international footballers